The Lucknow–Sitapur–Sehramau-Pilibhit Provincial State Railway was owned by the Provincial Government and worked as part of the Indian Railways.

History
The following three metre gauge sections opened as part of the Lucknow–Sitapur–Seramow Provincial State Railway: namely Lucknow to Sitapur (55 miles) opened 16 November 1886, Sitapur to Lakhimpur (28 miles) opened 15 April 1887 and Lakhimpur to Gola Gokaran Nath (22 miles) opened 4 December 1887. The Lucknow–Sitapur–Seramow Provincial State Railway merged with the Bareilly–Pilibheet Provincial State Railway to form the Lucknow–Bareilly Railway on 1 January 1891.

Conversion to broad gauge 
The railway lines were converted to  broad gauge in 2017.

Notes
 Rao, M.A. (1988). Indian Railways, New Delhi: National Book Trust
 Chapter 1 - Evolution of Indian Railways-Historical Background

1886 establishments in India
1891 disestablishments in India
Railway companies established in 1886
Railway companies disestablished in 1891
1891 mergers and acquisitions
Metre gauge railways in India
Defunct railway companies of India
History of rail transport in Uttar Pradesh
Transport in Lucknow